José Ricardo da Silva, also known as China (born 11 September 1939, in Fortaleza) is a retired Brazilian professional footballer who played as a forward.

da Silva played for six seasons (101 games, 37 goals) in the Italian Serie A for U.C. Sampdoria, A.S. Roma, L.R. Vicenza and A.C. Mantova.

Honours
 Campeonato Carioca champion: 1961, 1962
 Torneio Rio – São Paulo winner: 1962
 Represented Brazil at the 1960 Summer Olympics

References

1939 births
Living people
Brazilian footballers
Botafogo de Futebol e Regatas players
Brazilian expatriate footballers
Expatriate footballers in Italy
Serie A players
U.C. Sampdoria players
A.S. Roma players
L.R. Vicenza players
Mantova 1911 players
Bangu Atlético Clube players
Footballers at the 1960 Summer Olympics
Olympic footballers of Brazil
Association football forwards
Pan American Games medalists in football
Pan American Games silver medalists for Brazil
Footballers at the 1959 Pan American Games
Medalists at the 1959 Pan American Games
Sportspeople from Fortaleza